The Illawarra Premier League is a regional Australian semi-professional association football league, comprising teams from the Illawarra, and South Coast regions of New South Wales. The competition is run under the Football South Coast body, an associate of Football NSW - a member federation of Football Federation Australia.  It therefore fits below the national A-League and NSW wide divisions including National Premier Leagues NSW, The league sits at level 2 on the New South Wales league system, making it a level 3 league in the Australian League System. The major sponsor for the Illawarra Premier League is the Illawarra Mercury and as such the competition is often referred to as the Illawarra Mercury Premier League.

History
The Illawarra Premier League was founded in 1977 with Berkeley taking out the inaugural championship, defeating Fairy Meadow 1-0 in the grand final. Fairy Meadow had won the inaugural Premiership.

Format
The competition consists of 12 teams from around the Wollongong, Illawarra, and South Coast regions of New South Wales. Each team plays each other twice, to form a 22-round, round robin format. 5 teams progress to a month-long finals series. The final two teams play-off in a grand final to determine the winner.

Clubs
The following clubs competed in the 2020 Illawarra Premier League prior to the season cancellation due to the COVID-19 pandemic in Australia'''.

Honours
Port Kembla FC are the most successful Illawarra Premier League club, with 9 grand final wins, and 7 Premierships since the league's inception in 1977.

George Naylor Medalist
The George Naylor Medal goes to the player of the season.

Notes

References

External links
 Football South Coast website

 
1
Recurring sporting events established in 1977
1977 establishments in Australia
Sports leagues established in 1977